The Line is a linear smart city under construction in Saudi Arabia in Neom, Tabuk Province, which is designed to have no cars, streets or carbon emissions. The  city is part of Saudi Vision 2030 project, which Saudi Arabia claims will create around 460,000 jobs and add an estimated $48 billion to the country's GDP. The Line is planned to be the first development of a $500 billion project in Neom. The city's plans anticipate a population of 9 million. Excavation work had started along the entire length of the project by October 2022.

The project has faced criticism over its impact on the environment and the current population of the area, as well as doubts about its technological and economic viability.

Proposal 
It will stretch from the Red Sea approximately to the city of Tabuk. It is intended that it will have nine million residents, resulting in an average population density of 260,000 people per square kilometre. By comparison, Manila, the world's most densely populated city in 2020, had a density of 44,000/km2.

The city will be powered entirely by Renewable energy. It will consist of three layers, one on the surface for pedestrians, one underground for infrastructure, and another underground for transportation. Artificial intelligence will monitor the city and use predictive and data models to find ways to improve daily life for its citizens, with residents being paid for submitting data to The Line.

The estimated building cost is US$100–200 billion (– billion SAR), with some estimates as high as $1 trillion. It is claimed by the Saudi government that it will create 460,000 jobs, spur economic diversification, and contribute 180 billion SAR (US$ billion) to domestic GDP by 2030.

History
The plan for The Line was announced on 10 January 2021, by Saudi Crown Prince in a presentation that was broadcast on state television. Earthworks began in October 2021 and the first residents were expected to move in during 2024. , the first phase of the project was scheduled to be completed in 2030.

Crown Prince Mohammed Bin Salman, also Chairman of the NEOM board of directors, released a statement and promotional video on 25 July 2021, which led to more widespread media coverage of the project. This raised questions about the merits of the design and environmental issues, with critics concerned that the project would create a "dystopian" and "artificial" facility that had already displaced the Huwaitat indigenous tribe and would impact the migration of birds and wildlife.

In October 2022, drone footage released by Ot Sky confirmed that construction on The Line was underway and excavation works were taking place along the entire length of the project.

Reception
In an interview with Dezeen, associate professor Marshall Brown at Princeton University said he believed that in such large-scale urban planning, it would be difficult to achieve the slick, futuristic aesthetic seen in the concept art because of the large number of factors involved. Hélène Chartier of C40 Cities compared The Line to other, unrealised, linear city projects, such as the 1882 design by Soria and a 1965 proposal for a linear settlement in New Jersey.

Dutch architect Winy Maas said that while he would love to live in such an environment, its profile as seen in the concept art was monotonous and he believed it would facilitate unfavorable wind flow through the interior. He praised the overall concept for tackling densification and heat regulation inside the city. Philip Oldfield of the University of New South Wales said that the quality of life would probably come down to whether the city was well-managed, rather than to its visual flair.

Oldfield said the project would have a carbon footprint of about 1.8 gigatonnes of CO2 equivalent in the glass, steel, and concrete, because "you cannot build a 500-meter-tall building out of low-carbon materials". He said the 170-km profile would create a large-scale barrier to adjacent ecosystems and migratory species similar to that created by highways, and the mirrored exterior facade would be dangerous for birds.

Digital rights researchers such as Vincent Mosco suggested that the city's data collection scheme could make it a "surveillance city", because of arrangements that would distort consent to sharing data, and because Saudi Arabia's poor human rights record might imply potential misuse of data. Neom CEO Joseph Bradley said that the Neom coordinators were resolving privacy issues and that Saudi Arabia had a personal data protection law.

Aside from the merits of the projected city, there was also scrutiny of the actions of the Saudi government in pursuing the project. In October 2022, Shadli, Ibrahim, and Ataullah al-Huwaiti, of the Howeitat tribe, were sentenced to death when they refused to vacate their village as part of the NEOM megaproject. Shadli al-Huwaiti was the brother of Abdul Rahim al-Huwaiti, who was shot dead by security forces in April 2020 in his home in Al-Khariba, in the part of Tabuk province earmarked for NEOM, after he posted videos on social media opposing the displacement of local residents to make way for the project.

See also
 Arcology
 King Abdullah Economic City
 Masdar City
 Palm Islands
 Prince Abdulaziz Bin Mousaed Economic City
 Saudi–Egypt Causeway –  proposed bridge over the Straits of Tiran from Saudi Arabia to Egypt

References

External links 
 
  released 25 July 2022
 Saudi Arabia announces plans for the car-free linear city called The Line, 170 kilometers long as Part of Neom Project 

Planned cities in Saudi Arabia
Proposed populated places
Proposed special economic zones
Economy of Saudi Arabia
Special economic zones
2021 establishments in Saudi Arabia
Smart cities